The 2009–10 All-Ireland Senior Club Football Championship  was the 40th staging of the All-Ireland Senior Club Football Championship since its establishment by the Gaelic Athletic Association in 1970-71. The championship began on 18 October 2009 and ended on 17 March 2010.

Kilmacud Crokes were the defending champions; however, they failed to qualify after being beaten by Ballyboden St Enda's in a semi-final replay of the 2009 Dublin County Championship.

On 17 March 2010, St Gall's won the championship following a 0-13 to 1-05 defeat of Kilmurry-Ibrickane in the All-Ireland final at Croke Park. It remains their only championship title.

C. J. McGourty of the St Gall's club was the championship's top scorer with 2-28.

Results

Connacht Senior Club Football Championship

Quarter-final

Semi-finals

Final

Leinster Senior Club Football Championship

First round

Quarter-finals

Semi-finals

Final

Munster Senior Club Football Championship

Quarter-finals

Semi-finals

Final

Ulster Senior Club Football Championship

Preliminary round

Quarter-finals

Semi-finals

Final

All-Ireland Senior Club Football Championship

Quarter-final

Semi-finals

Final

Championship statistics

Top scorers

Overall

In a single game

Miscellaneous
 Portlaoise became the first team to win seven Leinster Club Championship titles.

References

All-Ireland Senior Club Football Championship
All-Ireland Senior Club Football Championship
All-Ireland Senior Club Football Championship